Aristotle and Dante Discover the Secrets of the Universe is a 2022 coming-of-age romantic film written and directed by Aitch Alberto in her feature directorial debut. It is an adaptation of the 2012 novel of the same name by Benjamin Alire Sáenz. It follows two Mexican American teenagers who find an instant connection in 1987 El Paso.

Aristotle and Dante had its premiere at the 47th International Toronto Film Festival on September 9, 2022.

Cast
 Max Pelayo as Aristotle "Ari" Mendoza
 Reese Gonzales as Dante Quintana
 Eugenio Derbez as Jaime Mendoza
 Eva Longoria as Soledad Quintana
 Verónica Falcón as Liliana Mendoza
 Isabella Gomez as Gina Navarro
 Luna Blaise as Ileana Tellez
 Kevin Alejandro as Sam Quintana
 Marlene Forte as Tia Ophelia

Production
In early 2017, it was revealed that Aitch Alberto was in the process of developing a screenplay based on Benjamin Alire Sáenz's novel. In 2016, she had flown to Texas to pitch her idea to Sáenz and discuss the rights to adapt his novel; she first read the book in 2014 and had written a spec script. At the beginning of 2018, she contacted Lin-Manuel Miranda, who had narrated the audiobook for the novel, inviting him to board the pop project as a producer. Kyra Sedgwick's newly launched Big Swing Productions joined the project in 2018.

Xolo Maridueña and Reese Gonzales, the latter of whom would go on to reprise his role in the film, performed a live reading of Alberto's screenplay at the 2018 Outfest. Also on the live reading were Norma Maldonado, José Zúñiga, Liz Torres, Ana Ortiz, Madison De La Garza, Martin Morales, Norio Chalico, and Matt Pascua.

It was announced in October 2021 that Max Pelayo and Gonzales would respectively star as the titular characters in the film adaptation with Eugenio Derbez, Eva Longoria, Verónica Falcón, Isabella Gomez, Luna Blaise, and Kevin Alejandro rounding out the cast. Derbez would also produce the film for 3Pas Studios alongside Valerie Stadler, Ben Odell, and Dylan Sellers and Chris Parker for Limelight. David Boies and Zack Schiller of Boies Schiller Entertainment would executive produce the film and CJ Barbato would co-produce.

Principal photography began in early October 2021, and was confirmed by director Aitch Alberto to have wrapped on November 2, 2021.

Sarah J. Coleman, who illustrated the book cover, was brought on board to design the film's main title and credits. Alberto has also stated that a film adaptation of the book's 2021 sequel is being considered.

Release
In August 2022, the film was announced to be premiering at the 2022 Toronto International Film Festival's "Discovery" section, and had its world premiere on September 9, 2022, with additional screenings on September 11 and 15. The film is currently seeking distribution.

In December, it was announced as a selection for the 34th annual Palm Springs International Film Festival in the "New Voices New Visions" Category, with screenings on January 8, 9, and 15, 2023.

On January 31, it was announced as a selection for Miami Film Festival. There is a screening planned for March 10, 2023.

The film had been offered a prominent slot at the 2022 Sundance Film Festival, but Alberto opted to hold off until the autumn festivals to allow more time for "fine-tuning". She was included in Variety's prestigious "10 Directors to Watch" in January 2022 for her work on the film.

References

External links

2022 directorial debut films
2022 films
2022 LGBT-related films
American teen LGBT-related films
Films based on American novels
Films based on young adult literature
Films set in 1987
Hispanic and Latino American LGBT-related films
Films about Mexican Americans
Films produced by Lin-Manuel Miranda
Films produced by Zack Schiller
2020s American films